The men's competition of the high diving events at the 2015 World Aquatics Championships was held on 3 and 5 August 2015. The competition was divided into five rounds with jumps of 27m.

Results
Round 1–3 were held on 3 August at 14:00. Round 4 was held on 5 August at 14:00. Round 5 was held on 5 August at 14:50.

References

Men